Lamesa Independent School District is a public school district based in Lamesa, Texas (USA).

In addition to Lamesa, the district also serves the city of Los Ybanez.

The Lamesa athletic teams are known as the Golden Tornadoes or "Tors" for short.
In 2009, the school district was rated "academically acceptable" by the Texas Education Agency.

Schools
Lamesa High School (Grades 9-12)
Lamesa Middle School (Grades 6-8)
North Elementary School (Grades 3-5)
South Elementary School (Grades PK-2)

References

External links
Lamesa ISD

School districts in Dawson County, Texas